Girls to Buy is a 2021 Polish erotic drama film about the life of Dubai escort girls. It stars Paulina Gałązka, Olga Kalicka, Katarzyna Sawczuk, Giulio Berruti, Katarzyna Figura, Jan Englert, Beata Ścibak-Englert, Anna Karczmarczyk and Józek Pawłowski.

Girls to Buy is a story about Polish celebrities who went to Dubai for the purposes of sex work. The book Girls from Dubai written by Piotr Krysiak in 2018, on the basis of which Doda, a singer turned producer, decided to make a film. Maria Sadowska took on as director.

Plot
A young ambitious girl is dreaming of a better life. When the opportunity arises, she dives in without hesitation, becoming an exclusive high-end escort in the Middle East. Soon at the invitation of Arab sheiks, she begins to recruit Polish girls, celebrities, actresses and models. However, this inaccessible, luxurious world will soon show its dark side. Based on true stories, Girls to Buy exposes the hypocrisy of the Polish show business and uncovers the truth behind the "Dubai scandal".

Cast
 Paulina Gałązka
 Olga Kalicka 
 Katarzyna Sawczuk
 Giulio Berruti
 Katarzyna Figura
 Jan Englert
 Iacopo Ricciotti
 Andrea Preti 
 Luca Molinari
 Beata Ścibak-Englert
 Anna Karczmarczyk 
 Józef Pawłowski

Reception

Box office
The film was shot in Poland, France and the United Arab Emirates, with a budget that has been kept under wraps. The film had the best opening for a domestic film in 2021, racking up 278,000 ticket sales. It’s also the second-best result overall, with only the most recent James Bond action film, No Time to Die, selling more tickets during the first weekend of its Polish release: 440,000.  During the second weekend after the premiere, the movie attracted 602 383 viewers in front of the screens. According to the distributor, Kino Świat, "the current box office result of the film classifies it as the biggest Polish hit of the year". As of December 2021, the film was screened at cinemas in Great Britain, Germany, the Netherlands, Ireland, Belgium, Luxembourg, Sweden, Denmark, Norway, United States, and Iceland.

Critical response 
Girls to Buy, which boasts a cast of international male actors, had a great opening weekend. It came as something of a surprise, given that the audience for domestic films in Poland kept dropping during the pandemic.  According to the Polish critics, Girls from Dubai, also known as Girls to Buy, was effectively produced, where most of the scenes shown on the screen were full of beauty, luxury, and glitz. In addition, the critics stated that the plot was moving very quickly and efficiently during the first part of the film, while it slowed down in the second part of the movie becoming a bit more chaotic. The film is full of genuinely funny dialogues, and numerous erotic scenes shown with care.

References

External links
 

2021 films
2020s erotic drama films
2020s Polish-language films
Polish erotic drama films
Films set in Dubai